Robert (Bob) Fischer (born 15 November 1972) is a British broadcaster, writer and performer. As a regional broadcaster he is best known as a DJ and radio presenter for BBC Tees, as a writer for writing the book Wiffle Lever To Full! (2009), and a columnist for the Fortean Times in the area of Hauntology.

Early life
Fischer was born in November 1972 in Middlesbrough, in north east England. He attended Levendale Primary School and Conyers' School in Yarm, before going on to read Linguistics at Lancaster University.. He changed programmes, and subsequently completed a degree in Philosophy.

Career
Fischer was a presenter for BBC Tees in the north east of England until Spring 2020. He presented a three-times-weekly evening show mixing music, arts and culture, which often featured local musicians, performers and writers. He has previously also presented shows during daytime and weekends. For a number of years he also fronted the station's BBC Introducing output, and remains a well-known figure in the local music and arts scene. He has also been a guest presenter on BBC Radio 6 Music. As well as presenting, he also produced a documentary for the station about local folklore for the station in 2014, Worms, Witches and Boggarts. 

His book, Wiffle Lever to Full!, first published in 2009, is a mix of travelogue and memoir, talking about his childhood love of science fiction, revisiting it as an adult by attending a number of fan conventions and recording the experience.

His regular column for the Fortean Times began following positive reception for an article he wrote for the publication, The Haunted Generation, about unsettling elements of children's television in the 1970s and 1980s. He also contributes reviews to Electronic Sound magazine. 

In 2018, together with the writer Andrew T Smith, he co-wrote and performed in the show Summer Winos, about the television show Last of the Summer Wine at the Edinburgh Fringe, and subsequently on a national tour into 2019.

He hosts occasional live shows under the Chinwag banner, featuring Q&A sessions with performers such as Ray Brooks and Reece Dinsdale. 

He also acts as host for live shows under the banner Scarred For Life, with the authors Stephen Brotherstone and Dave Lawrence, again about the hauntological aspects of 1970s and 1980s broadcast media.

He has appeared as a guest on several podcasts, including the cultural commentator and writer Tim Worthington's Looks Unfamiliar in May 2019. and August 2020.

References

External links
 The Haunted Generation
 Bob Fischer at BBC Tees
 Hauntologist

1972 births
21st-century English memoirists
BBC radio presenters
Living people
People from Middlesbrough
Alumni of Lancaster University
English columnists